Aluette or Vache ("Cow") is an old, plain trick-taking card game that is played on the west coast of France. It is played by two teams, usually of four people, but sometimes also of six. It is unusual in using a unique pack of 48 Spanish playing cards and a system of signalling between playing partners. The French colloquial names for the game, jeu de la Vache or Vache, refer to the cow depicted on one of the cards.

History 
This game is apparently very old with references to the game of "luettes" by François Rabelais in the early 16th century. As the cards use Spanish suits, Aluette may even predate the invention of French playing cards around 1480. "La luette" means uvula in French and may refer to the fact that it is played with codified signs that allow team members to provide information on their cards during the game. The game is also called "la vache" (the cow) because of the illustration on the 2 of cups card. Due to similarities it has with the game of truc, aluette may have been imported by Spanish merchants.

Distribution 
Aluette was traditionally played in rural and coastal areas in France between the estuaries of the Gironde and the Loire, that is to say, in the western part of the language area of the Saintongeais and Poitevin dialects, especially in its centre, in the department of the Vendée and in the Pays de Retz as far as Saint-Nazaire, as well as in Brittany. It was also played on the overseas islands of Saint Pierre and Miquelon near Canada.

Aluette was played as a family game, in tournaments, in clubs and very commonly in cafés until the 1960s. At that time, it was still played around the Brière and in the Guérande peninsula. It was also played a lot in the ports of Cotentin, where it has now died out.

Cards

Aluette uses a unique deck of 48 Spanish-suited playing cards where certain pip cards depict figures to show that they outrank their face value. The modern cards are based on those made in Thiers in the Auvergne until the 17th century for the Spanish market. The Spanish suit signs are Coins, Cups, Batons and Swords. These cards are attested in Frances in the 17th and 18th centuries, when French cardmarkers, especially from Thiers, exported them to Spain via Nantes. After 1700, cardmakers also set up manufacturing in Nantes.

There are 48 cards numbered from 1 (Ace) to 9, Valet (Jack), Cavalier (Queen), and King. The design of the cards had a long evolution that was not fixed until the beginning of the 19th century. The strongest cards in the game (the Luettes, Deuces and Aces) as well as a few low cards have characteristic portraits and symbols, which mean that the pack is specific to the rules of the game and is therefore sold under this name. However, nothing prohibits playing a Spanish game if the cards are sufficiently well known to the players. And, at a pinch, one could play with a pack of French-suited cards by removing the 10s and agreeing on a correspondence between suits.

The figures on the cards give rise to their nicknames and are associated with certain gestures players pass to their teammate. The cards rank as follows:

The Luettes:
1. 3 (Monsieur/Mister) - look upwards
2. 3 (Madame/Mistress) - tilt head to the side
3. 2 (Le borgne/the Blind) - wink
4. 2 (La vache/the Cow) - pout a "moo"

The Doubles:
5. 9 (Grand Neuf/Great Nine) - show the thumb
6. 9 (Petit Neuf/Small Nine) - show the little finger
7. 2 (Deux de chêne/Two of Oaks) - show the index and middle finger
8. 2 (Deux d'écrit/Two of Writing) - mime writing

The Figures:
  9. A  A A A (As/Ace) - open your mouth
10. R R R R (Roi/King)
11. C C C C (Chevalier/Cavalier)
12. V V V V (Valet/Jack)

The Bigailles:
13. 9 9 
14. 8 8 8 8
15. 7 7 7 7
16. 6 6 6 6
17. 5 5 5 5
18. 4 4 4 4
19. 3 3

Within the Figures and Bigailles the suits have no order of precedence. For example, all Aces are of equal value and beat all Kings, etc. The 5 depicts of a couple kissing (believed to represent the Catholic Monarchs) and the traditional signal is to "kiss hard" but it has no special value.

Many of the illustrations on Aluette decks appeared in other early Spanish packs but have since disappeared like the six-pointed stars on the Four of Coins.

Grimaud, a subsidiary of Cartamundi's France Cartes, is the only producer of Aluette decks at present. Since 1998, cards have included the nicknames, hinting gestures, and game ranking indices on their cards.

Rules 
The origin of the rules of the Aluette remains unknown. There are two different hypotheses:
 Aluette came from Spain and was introduced into France by Spanish sailors in the French ports of the west. Curiously, however, it has never been recorded in the south-west of France and, if true, the game has disappeared from Spain without leave a trace.
 Aluette originated in west France using the only pack of cards existing in the 16th century and it resisted the general conversion to French cards which took place in the 18th century.

Aluette's rules have evolved over the centuries. The most basic feature is that it is a plain trick game without trumps, similar therefore to Battle. The use of facial expressions is the most visible feature of the game, but is not unique to Aluette. Card games with very different rules use signalling:
 Mus, a Basque game known since the 18th century, is played with a Spanish deck of forty cards;
 Brisca, a Spanish game adapted from the French Brisque, is played with a Spanish pack of forty cards;
 Watten, a Bavarian and Austrian game, is played with 36 German-suited cards;
 Perlaggen, a Tyrolean game played with 33 German-suited cards;
 Truc y Flou, a card game of Aragonese origin.

However, Trut or Truc, a signalling game reported in the west of France from the 16th century,<ref>"Ol ée la respondation de Talebot" in La Gente poitevinrie tout again racoutrie ou  Tabelot bain, et bea (1572), cf. Jacques Pignon, éd., La Gente poitevinrie, a collection of texts in Poitevin patois of the 16th century,  Paris, 1960, reprint. The Crèche, 2002, IV. Étienne Tabourot also mentions play in his "Amphibological Sonnet" (1570), cf. Bigarrures (1583), I, 6.</ref> also known in Catalonia and South America (as Truco), shares the same mechanism and the same rule structure as Aluette, so these two games may have a common ancestor.

 Play 

The cards are dealt clockwise with each player receiving nine cards and twelve cards should be left over. Alternatively, if all players agree, the remaining 12 cards can be dealt to the dealer and first hand (le premier en cartes), the player to the dealer's left. Each would then discard the six lowest cards in their hand. This is known as chanter (singing).

Each deal consists of nine tricks. The tricks taken are counted per person and not per team. At the end of the deal, the player who has taken the most tricks earns a point for the team. If two players have won the same number of tricks, the first to have reached the winning number of tricks wins the deal. First hand becomes the next dealer and starts the next deal. A game comprises five deals.

First hand leads to the first trick. Any card can be played but only the highest will win. If there is a tie, then the trick is 'spoiled' (pourri) and no one wins that trick. The player that wins or spoils the trick will lead to the next. Players may only communicate to their partner using signals and gestures as described above.

A special rule is that any player who wins the last three tricks without having won the previous six, will win the deal and score 2 points. This is making mordienne. Players can signal their intention to make mordienne to their partner by biting their lips. Players who feel that they may have a bad hand can raise their shoulders signalling to their partner that they should give up. Surrendering is an option as it will award only one point to the opposition rather than two if mordienne was achieved.

 Example of an Aluette pack 

The images below come from an Aluette pack published in the second half of the 19th century by cardmakers, Grimaud:

 Footnotes 

References

 Literature 
 Borvo, Alain (1997). Anatomie d'un Jeu de Cartes: L'Aluette ou le Jeu de Vache. Nantes: Yves Vachon
 Linden, Gérard (2007). La boule de fort par noms et par mots, Cheminement, pp. 12–15. 
 Parlett, David (2008), The Penguin Book of Card Games'', London: Penguin,

External links 
 Aluette rules by John McLeod at pagat.com
 Aluette rules at Ren Fest HQ
 Modern aluette cards at Alta Carta
 Pre-1998 Grimaud editions at World Web Playing Card Museum
 Cards from earlier manufacturers at aluette.net
 Règle du Jeu d'Aluette

Dedicated deck card games
French card games
Put group
Card games involving signalling